Serra dels Pesells is a mountain chain located near the southern end of the Catalan Pre-Coastal Range between Bot and Arenys de Lledó.
The ridge's highest point is 541,3 m. This smooth range runs in a NNE - SSW direction and divides the basins of the Canaletes and Algars rivers. It is one of the isolated hills of the Catalan Central Depression and it is located at its southwestern end.

Currently wind turbines are being built on top of the Serra dels Pesells ridge. People in nearby Caseres town, who derive some income from rural tourism, are worried that the turbines will mar their picturesque surroundings.

See also
Catalan Central Depression

References

External links
Map of the area  
Terra Alta Turismo Rural de Montaña
La Batalla de l'Ebre 

Pesells